A correction in a newspaper consists of posting a public notice about a typographical error or factual mistake in a previously published article.

Newspapers usually have specific policies for readers to report factual errors. Generally, this requires the reader to contact an editor, pointing out the mistake and providing the correct information. Sometimes, an editor or affected reporter will be asked to refer to a note or press release to determine how the mistake was made.

In print newspapers, a correction notice will often appear in its own column in a subsequent issue.

In online news media, a "trashline" or "advisory line" may be added to the top of a corrected article. According to the Reuters Handbook of Journalism, "the trashline should say exactly why a story is being withdrawn, corrected, refiled or repeated. All trashlines on refiles and corrections must include the word 'corrects' or 'correcting'."

A correction differs from a clarification, which clears up a statement that – while factually correct – may result in a misunderstanding or an unfair assumption.

Examples
Most newspaper errors are relatively minor, but even mere typos or atomic typos can adversely affect a story, such as:

 Names – Names misspelled, someone was misidentified (e.g., in a photograph), their professional title was incorrect.
 Numbers – e.g., "the lawsuit was for $8 million, not $8 billion".
 Time/date/place – e.g., "the event will be on Friday, not Saturday".

However, some corrections are the result of major mistakes or carelessness in reporting, and in extreme examples involve such things as completely incorrect facts, gross misquotes and extreme misrepresentations. Following are some examples:

From The Guardian, 2004: 

From the New York Daily News, 2009: 

In 2003, The New York Times published an article containing factual errors and misquotes contained in articles written by Jayson Blair, the reporter who became the central figure in the newspaper's plagiarism scandal earlier in the year. The corrections affected 10 articles that had been published from 2000 to 2003, with the errors reported to the newspaper after the scandal broke.

One 2007 study suggested that "fewer than 2 percent of factually flawed articles" in daily newspapers are actually followed by a correction.

See also
 erratum: correction in publications and industrial specifications.
 Hamilton Naki: an incident of delayed corrections.
 Journalism ethics and standards
 Retractions in academic publishing

References

Further reading
 Amster, Linda, and Dylan Loeb McClain. Kill duck before serving: red faces at The New York Times: a collection of the newspaper's most interesting, embarrassing, and off-beat corrections. New York: St. Martin's Griffin, 2002. .
 Silverman, Craig. Regret the error: how media mistakes pollute the press and imperil free speech. New York: Union Square Press, 2007. .

External links

 Kinsley, Michael. The shaky war on errorism. Washington Post, 4 September 2009.
 Lo Dico, Joy. Why, in the world of newspapers, sorry seems to be the largest word. The Independent, 23 March 2008.
 Lyall, Sarah. Confession as strength at a British newspaper. New York Times, 16 February 1998.

Newspaper content
Error